The Wave class was a class of replenishment oilers built for service supporting the Royal Navy during the later years of the Second World War. They were subsequently transferred to the Royal Fleet Auxiliary after the end of the war, and went on to support British and allied fleet units in Cold War conflicts such as the Korean War.

Design and construction
The expanding needs of the Royal Navy to carry out long range operations away from friendly fueling and replenishment stations led to the ordering of a number of tankers of around  displacement, able to carry  of fuel oil. These would allow the Royal Navy and its allies increased flexibility, particularly in the Pacific theatre, where there were large expanses of water and few friendly fuel stations. A total of twenty ships were eventually built by three British yards; 12 by the Furness Shipbuilding Company, Haverton Hill-on-Tees, three by Harland and Wolff at their yard in Govan, and the remaining five by Sir J. Laing & Sons Ltd, at Sunderland.

Service
Thirteen of the 20 of the ships were initially built for the Ministry of War Transport (MoWT), which assigned them to be operated by various merchant shipping lines. Consequently, most were named with the standard MoWT prefix "Empire". The remaining MoWT owned oilers were transferred to the Royal Fleet Auxiliary in 1946 and all were given "Wave" names. Several of the RFA ships served in the Far East during the Second World War, while the class was heavily involved in the Korean War.

Most of the remaining vessels had been scrapped by the mid-1960s, but refits and modifications allowed several to continue in service until the mid-1970s, with Wave Chief the last to be retired, in 1974.

Ships

Notes

References

External links

 
Auxiliary replenishment ship classes
 Wave